The purple needletail (Hirundapus celebensis), or hagibas in Tagalog,  is the largest swift found in the Old World. It is native to the Philippine archipelago and the Minahasa Peninsula (Sulawesi).

This bird lives in various forests and open country.

Only the white-naped swift rival this species for size and averages  less than this needletail. The overall plumage is mostly uniform blackish, with a whitish loral marking. This species has the large size, white horseshoe-shaped underside-marking, and the subtly-needled tail typical of the needletails. Compared to other needletails, it is extremely dark and is the only one without a pale throat patch.

Few detailed descriptions of the life history of the purple needletail are known. It is a gregarious species, probably never leaving a group of at least 20 birds. The large size of these swifts is said to be apparent even from a distance. It is believed to take any kind of large, flying insect; sometimes even hanging around bee-farms to pick off members of a hive. The breeding habits are unknown, although it is thought that this is a cave-nesting bird. The voice is also unknown.

The commonality of this species is not really known. They are thought to be scarce to uncommon through most of their range, but are not endangered and can be numerous in some parts of the Philippines.

References

 Chantler and Driessens, Swifts 

purple needletail
Birds of the Philippines
Birds of Sulawesi
purple needletail
purple needletail